Bryan Hipp (22 January 1968 – 21 October 2006) was an extreme metal guitarist. He played in the bands Brutality (1993–1995), Cradle of Filth (1994–1995), Acheron (1998), Unholy Ghost, Diabolic (1999) and Blastmasters.

He was one of the many people to assume the live role of the fictional "Jared Demeter" during his time with Cradle of Filth; after leaving the band, he was replaced by Paul McGlone.

Hipp died on October 21, 2006, of a drug overdose.

Discography 
 Brutality - When the Sky Turns Black (CD, 1994)
 Diabolic - Subterraneal Magnitude (CD, 2001)
 After Death - Consumed by Fire/Sulphur, Mercury and Salt (Demo, 2002)

References

2006 deaths
American heavy metal guitarists
1968 births
20th-century American guitarists
American male guitarists
20th-century American male musicians